Leni Alexander (8 June 1924 – 7 August 2005) was a German-Chilean composer.

Biography
Helene Alexander Pollak was born in Breslau, in Lower Silesia (now Wrocław, Poland), and her family lived in Hamburg and then emigrated to Chile in 1939 to escape the Nazis. She studied piano under the Montessori system of music and received a diploma in 1942 for teaching and worked with youth and disabled children while developing an interest in composition. Between 1949 and 1953, she studied with Fré Focke, Rene Leibowitz, and Olivier Messiaen. In Europe she became a friend of Bruno Maderna and Pierre Boulez. Between 1963 and 1968, she also studied electronic music and wrote a number of electronic pieces. She received a Guggenheim Fellowship in 1969 and lived for several years in Paris and Cologne.

Besides new music classical compositions and musical theater, Alexander was active in composition for television soundtracks and composed for soap opera. In her later years, she composed several "hörspiel" pieces, or "plays for listening", several of them for the WDR Radio of Cologne.

She married in Chile and had two sons and a daughter. On August the 7th, 2005, Alexander died in Santiago.

Works
Alexander's compositions were mainly instrumental and were performed by orchestras in countries including Chile, Italy, France and the United States.

Selected works include:
String Quartet (1957)
Cantata of death in the morning (1960)
Aulicio
Aulicio II
Méralo for guitar (1972) (dedicated and premiered by Leo Brouwer)
Ellos se perdieron en el espacio estrellado for orchestra (1975)
Chacabuco: Ciudades fantasmas, hörspiel (1994)
Cuando aún no conocía tu nombre (1996)

Discography
Jezira Santiago de Chile: Proyecto FONDART 2000.
Homenaje Santiago de Chile: Proyecto FONDART 2009.

References

External links
List of works

1924 births
2005 deaths
20th-century classical composers
Chilean composers
Jewish emigrants from Nazi Germany to Chile
Women classical composers
Jewish classical composers
Twelve-tone and serial composers
People from the Province of Lower Silesia
Silesian Jews
20th-century women composers